The Uniform Common Interest Ownership Act was created to provide a model set of laws to govern condominium, cooperative, homeowner association and planned unit development communities in the United States.  Variations of the act have been adopted in Colorado, Washington (state), and some other states.

External links
website of National Conference of Commissioners on Uniform State Laws

 NCCUSL enactment status map

 Washington statutes (adopted 2018)

Property law in the United States
Common Interest Ownership Act